Jesús Fernández Collado (born 11 June 1988) is a Spanish professional footballer who plays for Liga I club FC Voluntari as a goalkeeper.

Club career

Real Madrid
Born in Madrid, Fernández played youth football for three clubs. In 2007 he signed for CD Numancia, going on to play two seasons with the reserves in the Tercera División. In the 2009–10 campaign he was third choice with the main squad in the Segunda División, making his debut in the competition on 22 May 2010 in a 4–3 away loss against Real Unión.

Fernández returned to his hometown in 2010, joining Real Madrid and being assigned to Real Madrid Castilla in the Segunda División B. On 21 May 2011, in the last match of the season, he made his first-team and La Liga debut, replacing departing Jerzy Dudek in the last minutes of an 8–1 home demolition of UD Almería.

Fernández acted solely as third choice for the Merengues in the following two years, as understudy to Iker Casillas, Antonio Adán and Diego López. He made his first start on 1 June 2013, featuring in a 4–2 home victory over CA Osasuna in the last matchday.

Levante and Granada
On 4 August 2014, Levante UD reached an agreement with Real Madrid for the transfer of Fernández, who signed a two-year contract with the top division club. After being rarely used during his tenure, he moved to fellow league team Granada CF on 22 January 2016.

Cádiz and Cultural
On 21 July 2016, Fernández agreed to a two-year deal at Cádiz CF of the second division. Exactly one year later, and only three competitive appearances to his credit, he joined Cultural y Deportiva Leonesa in the same level.

CFR Cluj
On 17 August 2018, Fernández signed a contract with Romanian defending champions CFR Cluj.

Career statistics

Honours
Real Madrid Castilla
Segunda División B: 2011–12

CFR Cluj
Liga I: 2018–19, 2019–20

References

External links

1988 births
Living people
Spanish footballers
Footballers from Madrid
Association football goalkeepers
La Liga players
Segunda División players
Segunda División B players
Tercera División players
Segunda Federación players
CD Numancia B players
CD Numancia players
Real Madrid Castilla footballers
Real Madrid CF players
Levante UD footballers
Granada CF footballers
Cádiz CF players
Cultural Leonesa footballers
Hércules CF players
Liga I players
CFR Cluj players
Sepsi OSK Sfântu Gheorghe players
FC Voluntari players
Super League Greece players
Panetolikos F.C. players
Spanish expatriate footballers
Expatriate footballers in Romania
Expatriate footballers in Greece
Spanish expatriate sportspeople in Romania
Spanish expatriate sportspeople in Greece